St George is a rural town and locality in the Shire of Balonne, Queensland, Australia. It is the administrative centre for the Shire of Balonne.

Geography 

The town is  due west of Brisbane and the Gold Coast and sits just inside the region of South West Queensland, Australia.

St George is on the Balonne River which is reputedly an excellent fishing site for fish such as Yellowbelly and Murray Cod.

It sits at the junction of several highways including the Castlereagh Highway, the Moonie Highway, the Carnarvon Highway and the Balonne Highway. The only crossing of the Balonne River is the Andrew Nixon Bridge on the Balonne Highway.

History

Aboriginal people
The present township of St George was founded on the boundaries of three Aboriginal cultural groups, the Mandandanji to the north, the Kooma to the south-west and the Bigambul to the south-east.

These people of the Balonne River fished with hoop nets and hunted ducks and marsupials for meat. They supplemented their diet with the small native melons that grew in abundance in the area, and with yams dug out from the flats along the riverbanks. Their funeral rites consisted of constructing an elevated bark platform on which the deceased would be placed, with fires lit underneath to smoke and preserve the corpse. The mummified remains would then be wrapped in bark and possum cloaks and carried with care by the relatives until they were deposited in a hollow of a tree. Surrounding trees were marked and decorated.

British colonisation
In 1845, pastoralist squatters John Gordon Town and Christopher Bagot entered the vicinity looking for land to take up for cattle. The local Commissioner for Crown Lands, Roderick Mitchell conducted an expedition along the Balonne River later that year, taking the name for the river from the Aboriginal residents.

In 1846, the site where the town of St George now stands was Major Thomas Mitchell's Camp VIII of his expedition into northern Australia. He noticed the natural rocky ford across the Balonne River on St George's Day, 23 April, thereby naming the site St George's Bridge. He directed his second-in-charge Edmund Kennedy to construct a cattle depot there while he explored further north. Kennedy and his stockmen remained at St George's Bridge for around a month.

In 1847, the first cattle stations were established: Burgorah (also known as Warroo, owned by Robert Fitzgerald and managed by Patrick Brennan); Boombah (owned by Henry Dangar and managed by George Hazard); Gulnarbar (owned by George and Anthony Loder, and managed by William Clay); and Wagoo (also known as Wachoo or Culpa, owned by William Ogilvie Jnr, and managed by Robert Hazard).

Conflict with the local Aborigines over land and the killing of cattle ensued with around 40 Aboriginal people and up to nine whites being killed on Burgorah in 1849, Patrick Brennan being wounded in the leg by a spear. Aboriginal men later counter-attacked the stockmen on Burgorah, forcing them to flee to the nearby Boombah property, where Dangar's men were able to reinforce and arm both the stockmen and members of a rival Aboriginal clan. Upon returning to Burgorah, they slaughtered the resident Aboriginal people, burying around 70 of their corpses in a large pit.

In 1852, sweeps by the paramilitary Native Police began in the area. Sergeant Richard Dempster with property managers Patrick Brennan and others, shot at least five Aboriginal people on Wagoo. Later that year, a detachment under Lieutenant George Fulford drove the free Aborigines into the "back country". Some Aboriginal people were allowed to remain on the properties to be utilised as labourers and prostitutes. These were called "station blacks" and by 1855 there were around 40 remaining on Burgorah and 200 at Boombah.

By 1862, Burgorah and Gulnarbar were being utilised as a temporary Native Police barracks where Aboriginal prisoners were tied to trees and flogged, and occasionally shot dead. Lieutenant John Marlow and his troopers made a final sweep of the region in 1862, destroying Aboriginal camps and pursuing them as far as Angellala Creek where he "dispersed" them after a brief battle.

Township of St George
The township of St George was gazetted upon a portion of the Burgorah run in March 1864 with the first 59 parcels of land offered for sale a month later.

Andrew Nixon was contracted in 1890 by the Queensland government to build a timber bridge across the Balonne River at St George's Bridge. This was completed in 1892 and later replaced by the current Andrew Nixon bridge and Jack Taylor Weir in 1953.

The first St Patrick's Catholic Church was built in 1874; it is now known as the old parish hall.
On 3 May 1959 the new St Patrick's Catholic Church was blessed and opened.

The Balonne Beacon newspaper was published in St George from 2 January 1909 to 29 December 1954. The St. George Standard and Balonne Advertiser newspaper was published from 1878 - 1879 and 1902 - 1904.

Floods
The town was severely affected by flooding in March 2010, which peaked at 13.5 metres, and again in December 2010 - January 2011.

Flooding once again occurred in February 2012, and about 2000 residents were mandatorily evacuated on 4 and 5 February to evacuation centres in Dalby and Brisbane. A temporary levee was built in St George on the morning of 5 February (Sunday). The Balonne River reached a height of 13.85 metres on Tuesday 7 February.

Demographics

Climate

St George, experiences a hot semi-arid climate (Köppen: BSh, Trewartha: BShl); with very hot summers; warm to hot springs and autumns; and mild winters. Precipitation is moderately low throughout the year due to its distance from the coast. Climate data for St George was collected at the St George Post Office from 1881 to 1997.

Heritage listings 
St George has the following heritage-listed sites:
 Wagoo Road: The Anchorage

Economy 
The town is a centre for cotton growing, as well as sheep, wheat, onions, garlic, corn, carrots and grapes.

Facilities

St George has a visitor information centre, cultural centre, swimming pool, showground, bowling and the St George Golf Club. The address of the golf club is Wagoo Road. It was opened in 1948.

The town also has an airport, St George Airport.

Balonne Shire Council operates a library in Victoria Street.

The St George branch of the Queensland Country Women's Association has its rooms at 73 Victoria Street.

Christ Church Anglican is at 133 Victoria Street. The St George Lutheran congregation hold their services at the Anglican Church.

Education 
St George State School opened on 2 February 1874. In 1960 a secondary department was added which operated until St George State High School was opened in 1978.
St George State School is a government primary (Early Childhood-6) school for boys and girls at Grey Street. In 2015, the school had an enrolment of 217 students with 24 teachers (22 full-time equivalent) and 15 non-teaching staff (12 full-time equivalent). In 2017, the school had an enrolment of 246 students with 25 teachers (24 full-time equivalent) and 17 non-teaching staff (13 full-time equivalent). It includes a special education (Early Childhood-12) program.

St George State High School is a government secondary (7-12) school for boys and girls at 2 Victoria Street. In 2015, the school had an enrolment of 221 students with 25 teachers (22 full-time equivalent) and 24 non-teaching staff (17 full-time equivalent). In 2017, the school had an enrolment of 205 students with 28 teachers (23 full-time equivalent) and 20 non-teaching staff (16 full-time equivalent).

Burgorah South Provisional School opened in 1902. On 1 January 1909 it became Burgorah South State School. It closed on circa 1917. Myrtlemount Provisional School, Warrie Provisional School and Hollymount Provisional School (all named after local pastoral stations) opened on 29 September 1919 as a group of part-time schools (sharing a teacher between them). All three schools closed in 1922 due to low student numbers. Tow Towri State School opened circa 1931. It closed circa 1945. Towtowri is a local pastoral property. Rocky Crossing State School opened on 25 January 1988 and closed on 31 December 2003.

St Patrick's Catholic School was established by the Sisters of St Joseph of the Sacred Heart. The school opened on 19 February 1933. However, rain caused the official opening and blessing by Bishop James Byrne to be postponed to Sunday 28 May 1933. In 1988 the Sisters withdrew from the operation of the school and it is now under lay leadership.
St Patrick's School is a Catholic primary (Prep-6) school for boys and girls at 36-44 Balonne Street. In 2017, the school had an enrolment of 180 students with 14 teachers (12 full-time equivalent) and 12 non-teaching staff (9 full-time equivalent).

Events 
The St George show is celebrated every year over the Labour Day long weekend (weekend of the first Monday in May). Everyone is encouraged to go and locals have a great time sharing stories at the bar and watching the rodeo.

Sport 
The St George Dragons (named after the much more famous NRL team) play in the Roma District Rugby League competition.

Notable residents 
St George gained national attention with the election of local accountant Barnaby Joyce to the Australian Senate following the 2004 federal election. It is also the hometown of National Rugby League player Dale Shearer.

Sir Charles Kingsford Smith's father was also a resident being the Bank of New South Wales manager during the 1930s.

See also 

 St George Airport (Queensland)

References

Attribution

Further reading

External links 

 
 

 St George's New Website 2006
 Balonne Shire Council
 Fairfax Digital — St. George
 George Community Profile St George Community Profile
 Balonne Shire Internet Exchange

 
Towns in Queensland
Populated places established in 1862
Shire of Balonne
1862 establishments in Australia
Localities in Queensland